In algebraic graph theory, Babai's problem was proposed in 1979 by László Babai.

Babai's problem 

Is the set 
  
an invariant of the graph ? In other words, does  imply that ?

BI-group 

Open problem 
Which finite groups are BI-groups?

See also
 List of unsolved problems in mathematics
 List of problems solved since 1995

References

Algebraic graph theory
Unsolved problems in graph theory